Grand Prince Danyang (shortly as 단양대군, 丹陽大君; ; born Wang Hu), was a Goryeo Royal family member as the second son of Duke Gangyang and grandson of King Chungnyeol. He was promoted repeatedly and later reached the position as Three Grand Masters (삼중대광, 三重大匡). Though his niece, he would eventually become the maternal granduncle of King Gongyang.

Life
In 1320, Wang Hu went to Yuan dynasty and appointed as Deunggeuksa (등극사, 登極使) and sent to Daedo. In the following year, he went to Yuan again for celebrate the opening of Gaewon (개원, 改元) and their Empress Dowager's coronation.

In 1333, when King Chungsuk, his older half first cousin, stayed in Yuan, Wang Hu became Gwonseohaengseongsa (권서행성사, 權署行省事) while temporarily take charge of its affairs. After Chungsuk went to Eoyong Hall (어용전, 御容殿) in Pyeongyang, he then brought the National Seal (국인, 國印) along with Chanseongsa (찬성사, 贊成事), Jojeok (조적, 曺頔), Miljiksa (밀직사, 密直使), Jeonggi (정기, 鄭頎), etc for the King.

His grandmother, Princess Jeonghwa's older brother was a monk at Donghwa Temple (동화사, 桐華寺), made several thousand and hundred men as slaves, which Wang Hu benefited a lot. However, when civilians (양인, 良人) returned as a slaves (노비, 奴婢), Hu tried to inform the Yuan dynasty with cross the Yalu River, but failed after captured by the shackles sent by the Goryeo prime ministers, then returned to Gaegyeong.

In 1352, when Jo Ilsin (조일신, 趙日新) rebellion broke out, he invited King Gongmin to his house for a while. One year later, while Gongmin went to Chimwon (침원, 寢園; royal tomb) for did the Chunhyang (춘향, 春享; Ritual in Spring), Wang Hu attended as Aheongwan (아헌관).

In 1361, when the northwest was devastated by the invasion of Hong Geonjeok (홍건적) and Gaeseong was captured, Wang Hu surrendered along with Jeollipanseo Yi An (전리판서 이안, 典理判書 印安), General Gim Seogwang (대호군 김서광, 大護軍 金瑞光). Then, he gave them important military bases, where the land was fertile, where they could live and where there was grain in Gi County (기현, 畿縣). As a result, after Hong resigned became a problem, he and others were impeached by the inspectorate, their land and slaves were confiscated, also his descendants were also sentenced to imprisonment in 1362.

Based on

References

Grand Prince Danyang on Encykorea .

13th-century Korean people
Year of birth unknown
Date of birth unknown
Year of death unknown
Date of death unknown